Ivan Lietava  (born 20 July 1983) is a Slovak professional footballer who plays as a forward for 3. liga club ŠK Báhoň.

Club career
Lietava previously played for Spartak Trnava, Trenčín, Banská Bystrica, Žilina in the Slovak Super Liga, with a spell in Denizlispor in the Süper Lig, before his return to Slovak side Žilina.

In September 2011, Lietava went on loan to Dukla Prague until the end of the season, scoring on his debut in a 4–0 win over Hradec Králové. Lietava finished the season as Dukla's leading goalscorer, having scored 11 goals in 21 league matches.

References

External links
 
 MŠK Žilina profile
 
 

1983 births
Living people
Footballers from Bratislava
Slovak footballers
Association football forwards
FC Spartak Trnava players
AS Trenčín players
FK Dukla Banská Bystrica players
MŠK Žilina players
Denizlispor footballers
Konyaspor footballers
FK Dukla Prague players
FC Vorskla Poltava players
MFK Skalica players
Slovak Super Liga players
Süper Lig players
Ukrainian Premier League players
Czech First League players
Slovak expatriate footballers
Expatriate footballers in Turkey
Expatriate footballers in Ukraine
Slovak expatriate sportspeople in Turkey
Expatriate footballers in the Czech Republic